The 1955–56 Rugby Union County Championship was the 56th edition of England's premier rugby union club competition at the time.

Middlesex won the competition for the fourth time after defeating Devon in the final.

Final

See also
 English rugby union system
 Rugby union in England

References

Rugby Union County Championship
County Championship (rugby union) seasons